Fabrizio Freda (born 31 August 1957 in Naples) is an Italian business executive.

Biography
Freda was born in Naples and graduated from University of Naples Federico II in March 1981.

Career
He was appointed president and chief executive officer of The Estée Lauder Companies Inc. on July 1, 2009, succeeding William P. Lauder. He had joined the company in March 2008, when he was appointed president and chief operating officer. 

He was previously president of Procter & Gamble's Global Snacks division. Freda joined P&G in 1982 and spent 10 years in the health and beauty division.

His total calculated compensation in 2016 as chief executive officer, president and director at The Estée Lauder Companies Inc. was $48,369,401.

References

Italian businesspeople
Businesspeople from Naples
1957 births
Living people
Estée Lauder Companies people
Procter & Gamble people
University of Naples Federico II alumni